The Harmon Foundation was established in 1921 by wealthy real-estate developer and philanthropist William E. Harmon (1862–1928). A native of the Midwest, Harmon's father was an officer in the 10th Cavalry Regiment. 

The Foundation originally supported a variety of causes, including playgrounds and nursing programs, but is best known for having served as a large-scale patron of African-American art that helped gain recognition for African-American artists who otherwise would have remained largely unknown. Mary B. Brady was the director of the foundation from 1922 until 1967.

It offered awards for distinguished achievements in eight different fields: literature, music, fine arts, business and industry (such as banker Anthony Overton in 1927), science and innovation, education (for example, educator Janie Porter Barrett in 1929), religious service, and  race relations and sponsored traveling art exhibitions.

Beyond offering support directly to outstanding individuals in the Black community, its educational outreach included films and books.

Scholarships and Playgrounds 
The Harmon Foundation was established as "a medium through which constructive and inspirational service for others may be rendered."  William Harmon, who had for years been making secret philanthropic donations in the guise of his alter ego, "Jedediah Tingle," began his foundation's work with a test of the efficacy of loans vs. scholarships in college education, and outright grants to local municipalities for the purpose of establishing permanent playgrounds.

Awards (1926-1933) 
The William E. Harmon Foundation Award for Distinguished Achievement Among Negroes was created in 1926. It was offered for distinguished achievement in many different fields among Negroes or in the cause of race relations.  

The award recognized achievements in eight fields: 

 business and industry (such as banker Anthony Overton in 1927)
 education (for example, educator Janie Porter Barrett in 1929)
 fine arts
 literature
 music
 race relations
 religious service
 science and innovation

In seeking to reward excellence and increase prestige, the Foundation did not grant awards in every field at every presentation. Awards were most regularly granted in the arts, in part to meet the pent up energies of a generation of African American intellectuals and artists. Indeed, "submissions in the fine arts category was the chief venue open to African American artists," at least during the first decade of the Foundation's existence.

This helped art education programs grow in many areas. Among the many recipients of the awards were Hale Woodruff, Palmer Hayden, Archibald Motley (his winning piece was The Octoroon Girl), Countee Cullen and Langston Hughes.

Exhibitions (1927-1967) 

African Americans had struggled to find public exhibition space throughout the early years of the 20th Century. "Prior to the end of World War I, State Fairs and other such expositions were practically the only spaces Black artists had to display their art." The Foundation's annual Exhibition of the Work of Negro Artists, conceived by Mary Brady, was held in 1927 through 1931, 1933, and 1935. This series offered Black artists the first serious venue for exhibition available exclusively for their work on a something-approaching national basis. The exhibitions in 1927, 1928, and 1929 were held at International House, a residential and program center for international graduate students whose values and mission were held to be aligned with the Harmon's.

Key elements of the Harmon art exhibitions were offers of "substantial prizes" together with gold, bronze medals, and, perhaps more importantly, the Harmon Foundation arranged for these exhibitions to travel, opening spaces for the artwork where it would have been challenging for individual artists to gain exposure.

Laura Wheeler Waring was one of the artists featured the first year of the exhibitions, and the Foundation commissioned her to do portraits of prominent African Americans.

1933 Exhibition of the Work of Negro Artists, Art Centre, New York

Traveling Exhibitions

Joint Exhibitions 
Conrad Kickert (1933), sponsored jointly by the National Alliance of Art and Industry

See also

Sites 
William E. Harmon Foundation award for distinguished achievement among Negroes
David C. Driskell (worked closely Mary B. Brady to show works from the Harmon Collection in exhibitions)

Productions, Archived Materials 
Negro Schools in American Education Series: Xavier University: America's Only Catholic College for Negro Youth (Documentary)
The National Archives Catalogue: Harmon Foundation Collection (1922-1967)

Disestablishment 
The Harmon Foundation closed in 1967. Its substantial collection of art was dispersed among numerous museums, including the Smithsonian and the National Portrait Gallery in Washington.

Notes

References

 Driskell, David C. (2001). The Other Side of Color: African American Art in the Collection of Camille O. and William H. Cosby, Jr. Pomegranate. 
 Gates, Henry Louis, &  Evelyn Brooks Higginbotham (eds) (2009). Harlem Renaissance Lives: From the African American National Biography. Oxford University Press, USA. 

Foundations based in the United States
African-American arts organizations
Organizations established in 1922
Organizations disestablished in 1967
1922 establishments in the United States
1967 disestablishments in the United States